The Yobe River, also known as the Komadougou Yobe or the Komadougou-Yobe, is a river in West Africa that flows into Lake Chad through Nigeria and Niger. 
Its tributaries include the Hadejia River, the Jama'are River, and the Komadugu Gana River.  The river forms a small part of the international border between Niger and Nigeria.

There are concerns about changes in the river flow, economy and ecology due to upstream dams, the largest at present being the Tiga Dam in Kano State, with plans being discussed for the Kafin Zaki Dam in Bauchi State.

Notable towns near the river include Gashua, Geidam, and Damasak in Nigeria, and Diffa in Niger.

See also
Yobe State
Hadejia-Nguru wetlands

References

Rivers of Niger
Rivers of Nigeria
Geography of Borno State
Yobe State
Lake Chad
International rivers of Africa
Niger–Nigeria border